Rajagopal (only name) is a professor and researcher in business and marketing with the Monterrey Institute of Technology and Higher Education (Tec de Monterrey). He has written over forty books in his field and his work has been recognized by Level III (Highest level) membership in Mexico’s Sistema Nacional de Investigadores among other awards.

Life/Education
Rajagopal born in Jagadalpur, Chhattisgarh and received his masters in economics and a doctorate in marketing from Ravishankar University in India. His education was supported by fellowships from the British Council, the Indian Council of Social Science Research, one from the Ministry of Social Welfare in India and a national merit scholarship from the government of India.

Career
Rajagopal began his career first at the National Institute of Rural Development in Hyderabad from 1984 to 1994. He then went on to work with the Institute of Rural Management, Anand and the Administrative Staff College of India.

During that time, he wrote books and journal articles, which led to an invitation from the Tec de Monterrey to join its faculty in 2000 as a professor of marketing. He currently teaches He teaches competitor analysis, marketing strategy, advance sales management, advertising and communication and  services marketing  at both the undergraduate level and with the EGADE Business School at the graduate level, and is a visiting professor at Boston University.

Rajagopal divides his time in three broad areas: teaching and research, writing books on new concepts and editing journals, and considers teaching and research to be symbiotic. His research interests are in brand management, selling systems, services  marketing, international marketing, rural economic linkages and development economics. He believes that marketing is core to the development of “all societies, economy, and grown of nations.”

Recognitions
Recognitions for his work include being named best research professor at Tec de Monterrey in 2004, and Level III membership in Mexico’s Sistema Nacional de Investigadores in 2004. In 2006, he was inducted as a fellow of the Royal Society for the Encouragement of Arts, Manufactures and Commerce, London and a fellow of  the Chartered Management Institute . In 2008 and 2009 he was listed in Who’s Who in the World. In 2009 he was listed as one of the 2000 Outstanding Intellectuals of the 21st century at the International Biographical Centre in Cambridge and made a fellow of the Institute of Operations Management in the United Kingdom. In 2011 he received the ITESM Innovative Teaching Award.

Publications
Rajagopal has written over thirty five books on marketing and rural development, and about two hundred journal and other articles. (ankit)
Brand Management-Strategy, measurement and yield analysis (2013) 
Marketing Decision Making and the Management of Pricing: Successful Business Tools (2013) 
Managing Social Media and Consumerism: The Grapevine Effect in Competitive Markets (2013) 
International Marketing (2010) 
Dynamics of International Trade and Economy (2007) 
Marketing Dynamics (theory and practice) (2007) 
Marketing: Strategy, Implementation and Control (2004) 
Rural Marketing: Policy Planning and Management (1995)

See also
List of Monterrey Institute of Technology and Higher Education faculty

References

Academic staff of the Monterrey Institute of Technology and Higher Education

Living people
Year of birth missing (living people)